"Heart Half Empty" is a song written by Gary Burr and Desmond Child, and recorded by American country music artists Ty Herndon and Stephanie Bentley.  It was released in October 1995 as the third single from his debut album What Mattered Most.  The song reached number 21 on the Billboard Hot Country Singles & Tracks chart. It later appeared on Bentley's debut album Hopechest, which like What Mattered Most was released on Epic Records.

Content
The song is a ballad about two lovers who, in the emotion following a breakup, ask "Is my heart half full of the love you gave me / Or is my heart half empty, because your love is gone?"

Chart performance

References

1996 singles
1995 songs
Ty Herndon songs
Stephanie Bentley songs
Songs written by Gary Burr
Songs written by Desmond Child
Epic Records singles
Song recordings produced by Doug Johnson (record producer)
Male–female vocal duets